John Holloway (1 August 1920 – 29 August 1999) was an English poet, critic and academic.  Born in Croydon, South London (but then part of Surrey) and educated at the County School at Beckenham in Kent and the University of Oxford (New College), he served in the Royal Artillery and Intelligence during the Second World War and then pursued an academic career.   He was a fellow of All Souls College, Oxford, from 1946–60 and of Queens' College, Cambridge, from 1955–82, becoming a Life Fellow on his retirement.  He held a post as lecturer in English at Aberdeen University (1949–54), and then moved to the University of Cambridge, where he was successively Lecturer in English (1954–66), Reader (1966-72), and Professor of Modern English (1972–82).  He was elected a Fellow of the Royal Society of Literature in 1956.  Holloway gave the 1958 Chatterton Lecture on Poetry.  From 1961-63 he served as Byron Professor at the University of Athens.  As Chairman of the Department of English at Cambridge (1970–71), he initiated an important broadening of the undergraduate literature curriculum, in particular to include American literature.  He was married twice, in 1946 to Audrey Gooding with whom he had a son and daughter, and in 1978 to Joan Black.  He died in Cambridge.

Bibliography (incomplete)
Philosophy
Language and Intelligence (1951)
The Victorian Sage (1953)
Criticism
The Charted mirror
The Story of the Night (1961)
The Colours of Clarity
Widening Horizons in English Verse (1966)
The Proud Knowledge (1977)
Narrative and Structure (1979)
The Slumber of Apollo (1983)
Poetry
The Minute and longer poems
The Fugue and shorter pieces
The Landfallers
The Lion Hunt (1964)
Wood and windfall (1967)
Oxford Book of Local Verses (edited, 1987)
Civitatula (1993)
Memoir
A London Childhood (1966)

References

External links
Obituaries archived by Queens' College

Military personnel from Surrey
English literary critics
1999 deaths
1920 births
Alumni of New College, Oxford
Fellows of Queens' College, Cambridge
Writers from London
20th-century English poets
English male poets
20th-century English male writers
Fellows of the Royal Society of Literature
Fellows of All Souls College, Oxford
English male non-fiction writers
British Army personnel of World War II
Royal Artillery personnel